Illya Ernestovych Markovskyi (born 6 June 1997) is a Ukrainian professional footballer who plays as a forward for Meistriliiga club FCI Levadia.

Career
On 2 February 2018, the Ukrainian forward moved to Greece as a member of the youth team of PAOK. Before coming to Thessaloniki, he had already enjoyed his first professional experience in football, featuring for Slovenian side NK Rudar Velenje. The young forward played with PAOK U20s in the second half of the season, scoring 8 goals and serving 2 assists in 11 matches, and proved a vital cog of the outfit that won the Super League Souroti U20 title. He also trained numerous times with the senior team, making an impression and on 14 January 2018 extended his contract with the Superleague side for three years.

Career statistics

Club

References

External links

1997 births
Living people
Ukrainian Jews
Ukrainian footballers
Jewish footballers
Footballers from Odesa
NK Rudar Velenje players
PAOK FC players
Aiginiakos F.C. players
Trikala F.C. players
Ethnikos Achna FC players
Enosis Neon Paralimni FC players
Rodos F.C. players
Hapoel Haifa F.C. players
FCI Levadia Tallinn players
Super League Greece 2 players
Cypriot First Division players
Slovenian PrvaLiga players
Football League (Greece) players
Israeli Premier League players

Association football forwards
Ukraine youth international footballers
Ukrainian expatriate footballers
Expatriate footballers in Greece
Expatriate footballers in Slovenia
Expatriate footballers in Cyprus
Expatriate footballers in Israel
Expatriate footballers in Estonia
Ukrainian expatriate sportspeople in Greece
Ukrainian expatriate sportspeople in Slovenia
Ukrainian expatriate sportspeople in Cyprus
Ukrainian expatriate sportspeople in Israel
Ukrainian expatriate sportspeople in Estonia